The Power Player Super Joy III (also known as Power Joy, Power Games, and XA-76-1E) is a line of handheld Nintendo Entertainment System/Famicom video game console clones. They are notable for legal issues based on the violation of intellectual property rights held by Nintendo and its various game licensees. Manufactured by NrTrade, the Power Player line has been sold in North America, Brazil, Europe, Asia, and Australia.

Hardware

The system resembles a Nintendo 64 controller and attaches to a TV set. NTSC, PAL and SECAM versions are available. They all use a custom "NES-on-a-chip" (NOAC) that is an implementation of the NES's hardware such as its custom 6502, PPU, and PAPU.

The units resemble a Nintendo 64 controller, sometimes with a cartridge slot for Famicom games. They come packaged with a secondary 9-pin 6 button controller resembling a Sega Genesis controller, intended for a second player. They are packaged with a 9-pin light gun resembling a Walther PPK pistol. There is a non-moving joystick, added for visual appeal. Though the Power Player Super Joy's button layout is identical to that of the Nintendo 64 controller, the buttons have been mapped differently.  The C buttons of the Nintendo 64's controller function as A and B on the Super Joy, the A and B buttons of the Nintendo 64's controller are Start and Select on the Super Joy, respectively.  Finally, the N64 controller's Start button is the Reset button on the Super Joy. The units are available in multiple colors, including black, grey, red, and blue.

The consoles have 76 built-in games, although marketing frequently claims to have more than 1,000 ways of playing them. Hence, the game count of 76,000 is listed as a gold sticker on the box. Most of the included games had been originally released for the NES or Famicom, but some have been created by the manufacturer. Most of the games have had their title screen graphics removed to save space on the ROM chip.

There are a number of scenes depicted on the front and back of the boxes, but all of them are artistic stylized drawings or retouched photos—none of them are actual game screenshots. Some versions sold in the US have an unlicensed still image from Star Wars: Episode I – The Phantom Menace on the front of the box.

After this product gained some popularity, the Power Player 3.5, an improved model with more games, was released.  A wireless version of Power Games was also released.

History

When Nintendo discovered this product line, the company began strong legal action against importers and sellers of the consoles, and have obtained a temporary injunction against the import and sale of video game systems containing counterfeit versions of Nintendo games.

As of spring 2005, NrTrade quit selling these products, although they still retain stock by other companies. These are still in production in China by Eittek but not massively distributed.

On December 16, 2004, the FBI executed search warrants at two kiosks at the Mall of America in Minnesota and also searched storage facilities rented by Yonathan Cohen, an owner of Perfect Deal LLC of Miami, Florida.  The consoles, purchased wholesale at $7 to $9 each, sold for $30 to $70 each.  After confiscating 1,800 units of Power Player, each containing 76 copyrighted video game titles belonging primarily to Nintendo or its licensees, Cohen was charged in Minneapolis, Minnesota in January 2005 with federal criminal infringement of copyright for selling Power Player video games at kiosks at the Mall of America and other malls across the nation.  In April 2005, Cohen pleaded guilty to selling illegally copied video games.

Nine days after Cohen's guilty plea, 40 FBI agents arrested four Chinese nationals working in an international copyright infringement ring and seized 60,000 Power Player consoles in searches in Brooklyn, Queens, Manhattan, and Maple Shade, New Jersey.

In November 2005, Cohen was sentenced to five years in federal prison and was required to run ads in mall magazines to tell the public how he illegally sold knockoff video games at Mall of America kiosks.

Several shopping malls quit selling these products, though the product is still sold by other dealers such as flea markets.

See also
Generation NEX
Nintendo Entertainment System hardware clone
PocketFami
Polystation
Vii

References

External links
 A page with information about the Power Player Super Joy III 
 Online discussion about Power Player Super Joy System
 10 Hilarious Knock Off Gaming Consoles

Copyright infringement of software
Handheld TV games
Unlicensed Nintendo Entertainment System hardware clones
Video game controversies